Arbelodes sticticosta is a moth in the family Cossidae. It is found in south-eastern South Africa, where it has been recorded from the northern Eastern Cape Province, KwaZulu-Natal and Mpumalanga.

The length of the forewings is about 15 mm. The forewings are glossy pale olive-buff, with deep olive-buff dots along the termen at the end of all veins and a dark olive-buff subterminal line. The hindwings are glossy deep olive buff.

References

Natural History Museum Lepidoptera generic names catalog

Endemic moths of South Africa
Moths described in 1910
Metarbelinae